The 3rd Critics' Choice Movie Awards were presented on January 20, 1998, honoring the finest achievements of 1997 filmmaking.

Top 10 films
(in alphabetical order)

 Amistad
 As Good as It Gets
 Boogie Nights
 Donnie Brasco
 The Full Monty
 Good Will Hunting
 L.A. Confidential
 Titanic
 Wag the Dog
 The Wings of the Dove

Winners

 Best Actor:
 Jack Nicholson – As Good as It Gets
 Best Actress:
 Helena Bonham Carter – The Wings of the Dove
 Best Child Performance:
 Jurnee Smollett – Eve's Bayou
 Best Director:
 James Cameron – Titanic
 Best Documentary:
 4 Little Girls
 Best Family Film:
 Anastasia
 Best Foreign Language Film:
 Shall We Dance? (Shall we dansu?) • Japan
 Best Original Screenplay:
 Good Will Hunting – Ben Affleck and Matt Damon
 Best Picture:
 L.A. Confidential
 Best Picture Made for Television:
 Don King: Only in America
 Best Screenplay Adaptation:
 L.A. Confidential – Curtis Hanson and Brian Helgeland
 Best Supporting Actor:
 Anthony Hopkins – Amistad
 Best Supporting Actress:
 Joan Cusack – In & Out
 Breakthrough Performer:
 Matt Damon – Good Will Hunting
 Lifetime Achievement Award:
 Robert Wise

References

Broadcast Film Critics Association Awards
1997 film awards